Chinatown station is an underground SEPTA subway station in Philadelphia. It is located on the Broad Street Line's Broad-Ridge Spur, and is located at the eastern edge of Philadelphia's Chinatown at 8th and Race Streets. Corresponding to the signage in the Chinatown neighborhood, the station name signs are written in Chinese in addition to English.

The station is adjacent to the Temple University School of Podiatric Medicine and the former Philadelphia Police Headquarters.  Franklin Square and its abandoned PATCO station, which is scheduled to be reopened in 2024, are located a block east of the station.

North of the station, the subway runs underneath Ridge Avenue past the abandoned Spring Garden station, to the Fairmount station, after which it joins with the main tracks of the Broad Street subway. South of the station, the subway tracks run along 8th Street, parallel to the PATCO Speedline for two blocks, until the Broad–Ridge Spur approaches its terminus at the 8th Street station, located at 8th and Market Streets.

History
The station opened in 1932 as part of the Ridge–8th Street Subway. Trains originally operated from Market Street to Girard.

Station layout 
The station has two side platforms. The station's fare gates are located at street level.

Gallery

References

External links 
 

 Images at NYCSubway.org

SEPTA Broad Street Line stations
Railway stations in the United States opened in 1932
Chinatown, Philadelphia
Railway stations located underground in Pennsylvania